Éditions Julliard is a French publishing house. It was founded in 1942 by René Julliard.

Julliard was known as a discoverer and publisher of talents, in particular Françoise Sagan and Jean d'Ormesson. After Julliard's death in July 1962, the managing director, Christian Bourgois, took over the publishing house. Éditions Julliard was soon repurchased by the publishing house Presses de la Cité. Christian Bourgois created his own publishing house in 1966.

In 1953, André Frank and Jean-Louis Barrault created the review of the Renaud-Barrault books (Les Cahiers Renaud-Barrault), published at Éditions Julliard until Julliard's death, then at Éditions Gallimard.

Éditions Julliard was revived in 1988, when Christian Bourgois decided to appoint Élisabeth Gille as literary director. They sought out and published new talents, such as Lydie Salvayre and Régine Detambel, but also the great names of Éditions Julliard, like Françoise Sagan.

Christian Bourgois and Élisabeth Gille left the publishing house at the beginning of 1992, following internal disagreements with the Presses de la Cité. François Bourin succeeded them until 1995.

Starting in 1995, Betty Mialet and Bernard Barrault are managing directors of Éditions Julliard. They published, among others, Barbara Pravi, Philippe Besson, Jacques-André Bertrand, Laurent Bénégui, Philippe Djian, Yasmina Khadra, Mazarine Pingeot, Jean Teulé, Denis Robert, and Danièle Saint-Bois.

External links 
  Official site of Éditions Julliard

Book publishing companies of France
Editis